Gago can refer to surnames as well as first names. Notable people with the name include:

Surname 
Fernando Gago, Argentine footballer
Francis Gago, Venezuelan pageant titleholder
Gail Gago, Australian politician
Jenny Gago, American Latina actress
Mariano Gago, Portuguese politician
Peter Gago, Australian winemaker and author
Roberto Jiménez Gago, Spanish footballer
Carlos Viegas Gago Coutinho, Portuguese aviation pioneer

Given name 
Gago Drago, professional Dutch-Armenian welterweight kickboxer and martial artist